IV is the fourth studio album by American rock band Winger, and the first after their 1993 album Pull.

Background
According to frontman Kip Winger, one morning he "just woke up and heard the new Winger record" in his head, knowing just what he wanted to do with it. It was released in October 2006 on Frontiers Records. The album is the most musically progressive album of Winger's career. Lyrically, much of the album is sung from the perspective of U.S. soldiers stationed overseas. Kip Winger was inspired to do this after performing solo shows at U.S. military bases, and being touched by the stories of the soldiers he met.

The album cover, showing a U.S. soldier being watched over by angels, was drawn by comic book artist Ethan Van Sciver, known for his work at DC and Marvel Comics. Kip Winger was introduced to Van Sciver by a mutual friend in Florida.

Honors 
In 2009 Kip Winger was presented by U.S. General Harold Cross with an honorary plaque and U.S. flag that had flown in Iraq for the song "Blue Suede Shoes", which honors the service and sacrifice of the United States armed forces and their families.

Track listing

Personnel

Band
 Kip Winger – lead vocals, bass, acoustic guitars, keyboard 
 Reb Beach – co-lead electric guitar, background vocals
 John Roth – co-lead electric guitar, background vocals
 Cenk Eroglu – keyboard, guitars
 Rod Morgenstein – drums

Additional personnel
 Denny McDonald – additional background vocals
 Paula Winger – additional background vocals

Production credits
 Produced, engineered and mixed by Kip Winger
 Additional engineers: Tony Green, Matt Abbott and John Roth
 Pro-Tools engineers: Buckley Miller and Steve Warren
 Recorded at The Funky White House, Nashville, TN and Quad Studios, Nashville, TN
 Mastered by Richard Dodd
 Cover art design: Ethan Van Sciver
 Color artist: Moose Baumann
 Layout design: Pete Cotutsca
 Photos by Mark Delong

References

Sources
amazon.com
melodicrock.com
rebbeach.com sound samples from the album.

2006 albums
Winger (band) albums
Albums produced by Kip Winger
Frontiers Records albums